Superordinate may refer to:

 In metadata analysis and linguistics, an element of analytical relationship-classification schemes
 Superordinate goals, in psychology, those goals that further other specified goals
 Hypernymy, in the context of linguistic hyponymy and hypernymy